Luxenberg is a German language surname, of Luxembourg origins. It may refer to:

Christoph Luxenberg, pseudonym of an Islamic scholar
Geoff Luxenberg (born 1983), American politician

See also
Steven Luxenberg, fictional character on the television series The Wire
Weitz & Luxenberg P.C., New York law firm

German-language surnames
Surnames of Luxembourgian origin